Wait for Me: Ambient is a remix album by American electronica musician Moby. It was released on November 2, 2009. The album is an ambient re-recording by Moby of his album Wait for Me, released earlier in the year.

Wait for Me: Ambient was later included as a bonus disc on the deluxe edition of Wait for Me.

Track listing

Personnel 
Credits for Wait for Me: Ambient adapted from album liner notes.

 Moby – engineering, mixing, production, writing, instruments, vocals on "Mistake", artwork
 Hilary Gardner – vocals on "Hope Is Gone"
 Leela James – vocals on "Walk with Me"
 Chris Ritchie – cover design
 Kelli Scarr – vocals on "Wait for Me"
 Starr Black Shere – vocals on "Study War"
 Melody Zimmer – vocals on "jltf3"
 Amelia Zirin-Brown – vocals on "Pale Horses"

Charts

References

External links 
 

2009 remix albums
Ambient albums by American artists
Albums produced by Moby
Moby albums
Mute Records albums